Hugh IV, Count of Rethel (1244–1285) was a son of Manasses V and his wife, Isabelle of Écry. In 1272, he succeeded his father as Count of Rethel.

Hugues IV was married to:
 Agnes of Chiny
 Marie of Enghien
 Isabelle of Grandpré

With Isabelle, he had a daughter, Jeanne, Countess of Rethel, who succeeded him.  In 1290, Jeanne married Louis I, Count of Flanders.

References

Sources

Counts of Rethel
1244 births
1285 deaths
13th-century French people